The Oaks is an unincorporated community in Accomack County, Virginia. It is located on the outskirts of Atlantic, Virginia.

References

Unincorporated communities in Virginia
Unincorporated communities in Accomack County, Virginia